The Paris Fire Brigade (BSPP) is a French Army unit which serves as the primary fire and rescue service for Paris, the city's inner suburbs and certain sites of national strategic importance.

The brigade's main area of responsibility is the City of Paris and the surrounding  of Seine-Saint-Denis, Val-de-Marne, and Hauts-de-Seine (the ). It also serves the Centre Spatial Guyanais in Kourou, the DGA Military Rocket Test Centre in Biscarosse, and the Lacq gas field. As with the other fire services of France, the brigade provides technical rescue, search and rescue and fire prevention services, and is one of the providers of emergency medical services.

The brigade is one of two fire services in France that is part of the armed forces, with the other being the Marseille Naval Fire Battalion (BMPM). It is a unit of the French Army's Engineering Arm and the firefighters are therefore sappers (thus ). With 8,550 firefighters, it is the largest fire service in Europe and the third largest urban fire service in the world, after the Tokyo Fire Department and New York City Fire Department. Its motto is "Save or Perish" (French "").

History 

Selection and training 
The operational personnel ( i.e. other ranks or rank and file) are usually engaged for five years. They must have French nationality, be between 18 and 25 years old, have a clean criminal record and have at least a vocational training CAP certificate. The selection is three days long, with sports tests, psychomotor tests, medical examination, etc.

Training takes place in the Training Group (GI), at the fort of Villeneuve-Saint-Georges. The first period lasts two months, with the first aid and first responder training, and basic military instruction (including shooting). They then undertake practical training of four months in an operational fire company; this includes taking part in personal assistance and utility safety operations. The last stage of training is a further two months at the Training Group. Upon completing training, the firefighter joins a fire company.

Resources 

The BSPP consists of 8,550 personnel with 81 stations and facilities who conduct 1200 operations daily.
463 pieces of equipment
130 Pumpers
63 Aerial Devices
66 Ambulances
71 Command and Patrol vehicles
133 Special Engines
Fireboats
All terrain vehicles
Four wheel drives

Organisation 

The brigade is commanded by a Brigade General as part of the French Army's engineering arm. The brigade commander directly controls the Information and Public Relations Bureau, and who is assisted a Colonel-Adjutant, a General Council called a Cabinet and a Chief of Staff who controls the following Bureaus:
General Studies Bureau
Financial Programs and Budget Bureau
and three Assistant Chiefs of Staff:
Assistant Chief for Employment
Operations Bureau
Formation and Instruction Bureau
Prevention Bureau
Assistant Chief for Logistics
Techniques Service
Infrastructure Service
Administrative Service
Telecommunications and Information Service
Assistant Chief for Human Resources
Human resources Bureau
Personnel Welfare Bureau
Chief Doctor
Emergency medical service/SAMU
Chief of the Health Service

Operational staff are divided into three geographic groups, as well as a training group and a services group. The geographic groups are:
 First fire group – northeast Paris and Seine-Saint-Denis
 Second fire group – southeast Paris and Val-de-Marne
 Third fire group – west Paris and Hauts-de-Seine
Each of the geographic groups consists of 8 fire companies and a few special units that are not part of a company (including ambulance units). Each company in turn consists of 2-4 fire stations.

First fire group 

The First fire group of the Paris Fire Brigade covers northeast Paris and Seine-Saint-Denis and is based in the 18th arrondissement of Paris. It consists of the following companies:
 7th at Blanche
 9th at Montmartre
 10th at Landon
 12th at Ménilmontant
 13th at Aulnay-sous-Bois
 14th at Clichy-sous-Bois
 24th at Montreuil
 26th at Saint-Denis
Additional units include:
 Fire Group Staff
 EMS/SAMU
 Facilities (Maintenance) Group

Second fire group 

The Second Fire Group of the Paris Fire Brigade covers Southeast Paris and Val-de-Marne and is based in the 13th arrondissement of Paris. It consists of the following companies:
 1st at Chaligny
 2nd at Massena
 8th at Rousseau
 11th at Sévigné
 15th at Champigny
 17th at Créteil
 22nd at Rungis
 23rd at Saint-Maur
Additional units include:
 Fire Group Staff
 EMS/SAMU
 Facilities (Maintenance) Group

Third fire group 

The Third Fire Group of the Paris Fire Brigade covers Western Paris and Hauts-de-Seine and is based in Courbevoie, Hauts-de-Seine. It consists of the following companies:
 3rd at Port Royal
 4th at Colombier
 5th at Champerret
 6th at Grenelle
 16th at Boulogne
 21st at Plessis Clamart
 27th at Gennevilliers
 28th at Nanterre
Additional units include:
 Fire Group Staff
 EMS/SAMU
 Atelier Group

Training Group 

The Training Group of the Paris Fire Brigade provides education and training to all Paris firefighters. It consists of the following:
 Group Staff
 EMS/SAMU
 Center for Formation and Cadres
 Center for the Instruction of Recruits
 Basic Training Company
 Auto School, driving and repairs
 Support Company

Special services 

Controlled by Headquarters
Divers/SCUBA
Search and Rescue
Canine Service
Paris Fire Brigade Band
Gymnastic Team
Air Service
Boat Service

Frequency of operations 

The BSPP performs about 1200 interventions per day. During 2001:
 1st fire group: 163,081 interventions, including 9,606 fires
 2nd fire group: 136,078 interventions, including 5,583 fires
 3rd fire group: 150,376 interventions, including 5,234 fires
There are 6.16 million inhabitants in the BSPP zone (1999). This represents:
 per day: 19 interventions per 100,000 inhabitants
 per year: 7,300 interventions, including 331 fires, per 100,000 inhabitants

Ceremonial duties 
Traditionally, the Paris Fire Brigade parades twice during the Bastille Day military parade: once on foot, and a second time with its vehicles.  During the parade members are armed due to their membership in the armed forces.

Evening dance parties are held at fire stations on (or near to) Bastille Day.

See also 
 Police Nationale
 Prefecture of Police of Paris
 Sapeurs-pompiers

References

External links 

 Official Website – French
 Official Website – English
 Official professional retraining web platform – French Only

 
Military fire departments